This is the 66th edition of Torneo di Viareggio. The 2014 winners of the Torneo di Viareggio (in English, the Viareggio Tournament, officially the Viareggio Cup World Football Tournament Coppa Carnevale), the annual youth football tournament held in Viareggio, Tuscany, are listed below.

Format 
The 32 teams are seeded in 8 pools, split up into 6-pool groups. Each team from a pool meets the others in a single tie. The winning club from each pool and two best runners-up from both group A and group B progress to the final knockout stage. All matches in the final rounds are single tie. The Round of 16 after envisions penalties and no extra time, while the rest of the final round matches include 30 minutes extra time and penalties to be played if the draw between teams still holds.

Four additional clubs are allowed to enter the competition from the Round of 16 onward through a wild card, according to their record of achievements. The wild card will be given at the incontestable discretion of the organising committee. 2014 wild card: Juventus F.C., A.C. Milan, AACF Fiorentina, F.C. Internazionale Milano.

Participating teams
32 teams participate in the tournament. The list of the teams are below.

Italian teams

  Atalanta
  Serie D Selection U20
  Napoli
  Palermo
  Livorno
  Roma
  A.C. Siena
  Torino
  Genoa
  U.C. Sampdoria
  S.S. Lazio
  Varese
  Empoli F.C.
  Hellas Verona F.C.
  Parma
  Spezia

European teams

  FC Nordsjælland
  R.S.C. Anderlecht
  S.L. Benfica
  Stabæk Fotball
  HNK Rijeka
  FK Belasica
  PSV Eindhoven

American teams

  Club Guaraní
  Envigado
  Santos Laguna
  Nacional
  LIAC New York
  Desportivo Brasil

Asian teams
  Pakhtakor
African teams
  Congo U-17
Oceanian teams
  APIA Leichhardt

Group stage

Group A

Pool 1

Pool 2

Pool 3

Pool 4

Group B

Pool 5

Pool 6

Pool 7

Pool 8

References

External links
 Official Site (Italian)

2014
2013–14 in European football
2013–14 in Italian football
2014 in Brazilian football
2014 in Uzbekistani football
2014 in Australian soccer
2014 in Paraguayan football
2014 in Ecuadorian football
2013–14 in Uruguayan football
2013–14 in Mexican football
2014 in American soccer